The Māori renaissance, as a turning point in New Zealand's history, describes a loosely defined period between 1970 and the early 2000s, in which Maori took the lead in turning around the decline of their culture and language that had been ongoing since the early days of European settlement. In doing so, social attitudes towards Maori among other New Zealanders also changed.

Background
After European settlement began, Maori became increasingly concerned that their culture and language were being marginalised. The Māori population reached a low point at the beginning of the twentieth century, with less than 50,000 people, and the Pākehā population had grown to over 800,000. Until 1914, and possibly later, the perception of the Māori race was that it was capable and worthy of being saved, despite its terminal decline, but only by assimilation into a European system. After the Second World War, as Maori became increasingly urbanised, concerns grew that despite the benefits of assimilation, such as healthcare, Maori culture and language were dying out.

1970–75

By the start of the 1970s, a new generation of young, educated Maori looked for ways to redress the decline and to breathe new life into what survived of Maori culture. Nga Tamatoa (the Young Warriers) was a group formed by Auckland University students and, by 1972, it had branches in Wellington and Christchurch. One of its leader said at the time there was that "rage" at what had been lost and at how Maori "had become assimilated pseudo-Pakeha". The group chose to protest, focusing on the challenges facing Maori then, not on past grievances. Protest began on Waitangi Day, 6 February 1971, when Nga Tamatoa disrupted Rob Muldoon, the Finance Minister's, speech at Waitangi and a flag burning incident took place. In 1975, a hikoi (land march) led by Whina Cooper traversed the length of the North Island finished outside Parliament in Wellington. Thousands had joined the march, illustrating how Maori concerns about the loss of their culture and landholdings were reaching the wider public. This was followed by the Bastion Point occupation in 1977–78. In 1975, the Treaty of Waitangi Act was passed. It created the Waitangi Tribunal with judicial powers to inquiry into Crown breaches of the Treaty.

1975–2002
Moari identified an urgent need to address the declining use of Te Reo, the Maori language. Promoting use of Te Reo was identified as the cornerstone of Maori cultural growth. From the early 1980s, the kohanga reo movement of language nests was started, and this was followed by the creation of kura kaupapa in which schooling in Maori took place. By 1996, there were 765 kohanga in the country. Most of the funding for this came from Maori communities, not central government. In 1987, the Mauri Language Act came into force. It made Mauri an official language and it created the Māori Language Commission, which says it focuses on "promoting te reo as a living language and an ordinary means of communication".

By 1979, both main parties had recognised that New Zealand was ethnically diverse and in principal they had accepted the argument that Maori should be able to follow their own path and not be drowned within Pakeha mores. The labour government of the mid 1980s maintained the ongoing reforms. A bi-cultural approach to government policies had begun to set in. In 1985, the Treaty of Waitangi Act was amended to give the Tribunal's jurisdiction to cover claims going back to 1840, opening the way for numerous further claims from disgruntled iwi and hapu. Although the list of tangible benefits to Maori from the Treaty grew ever larger in the late 1980s, such as huge government payments to settle Tribunal claims,the  non-Maori public were generally dissatisfied. To assuage more the nation's consiounce than to better inform the public to historical reality around the Treaty, the sesquicentenary of its signing in 1990 was a choreographed theatrical exercise reflecting better what the nation's unconscious wanted to see rather than to inform about underlying historical issues. The past was remolded to appeal to the electorate. Ongoing Treaty settlements well into the hundreds of millions of dollars had begun: by 2001, and partly as a result of Treaty settlements, Maori assets had reached NZ$8.99 billion. Tribunal work relating to Treaty principals began to appear in legislation: by 1999, action related to the Treaty was required in eleven statutes from a total of 29 in which the Treaty was mentioned. Elsewhere, the Te Maori art exhibition (1984–1987) saw Māori art exhibited internationally for the first time.

By the 1990s, the fundamentals of a Maori recovery were well entrenched, and Maori advancement continued despite ongoing obstacles, such as the slow pace of Treaty settlements and a downturn in the economy. By 2000, the percentage of Maori in higher education, skilled and managerial roles had increased. However, activism returned in the 1990s, carried out by some who wanted further advances. Moutua Gardens in Whangui were occupied in 1995 by iwi claiming ownership rights, colonial era statues and in Auckland, One Tree Hill's lone pine were all damaged. Parliamentary changes took place as well. MMP was introduced at the 1996 General Election and by 2002 the number of designated Maori seats had risen from four to seven. In 2002, there were 20 Mauri MPs in a parliament of around 120 seats.

Post-renaissance developments and reflection, 2002–present 

The year 2004 saw the founding of the Māori Party, to date New Zealand's most successful Māori-specific party. Founded by former Labour MP Tariana Turia, the party gained four seats in the following year's general election. In the 2008 election, its seats increased to five, and the party also won seats in 2011 and 2014. In 2008, the party entered a loose alliance with the National Party, firstly as part of the opposition, and in 2011 and 2014 as a minor partner in government. Disaffection with National led to a slump in support in the Māori Party in 2017, and it won no seats.

Joseph Williams became the first appointed to the Supreme Court in 2019. Since the 1970s, the Renaissance has been a significant literary movement. It stresses a separate form of Maori nationalism, with its own forms of expression and its own history, that can be seen as representing a new post-colonial New Zealand. An established catalogue of notable authors has emerged, including Keri Hulme and Witi Ihimaera.

Proportional to the total New Zealand population, people claiming to be of Maori descent represented 8 percent in 1966 and about 14 percent in 1996.

See also
Māori language revival
Treaty of Waitangi claims and settlements
Māori protest movement

References

Bibliography

External links
    Podcast on the Maori Renaissance from the tertiary education provider Te Wānanga o Aotearoa
"Meet My Countrymen the Maoris" A 1946 "The Rotarian" article (p.18) illustrating Western society's thinking then about Maori and indigenous people everywhere.

Māori art
Counterculture
Politics of New Zealand
Māori education in New Zealand
Political terminology in New Zealand